Captiva School and Chapel-by-the-Sea Historic District is a national historic district located at Captiva, Florida in Lee County. It includes an early one-room schoolhouse, built in 1901 and transformed into a Methodist mission church in 1921.

It was added to the National Register of Historic Places in 2013.

References

External links

National Register of Historic Places in Lee County, Florida
Historic districts on the National Register of Historic Places in Florida
Churches on the National Register of Historic Places in Florida
School buildings on the National Register of Historic Places in Florida
2013 establishments in Florida
Captiva Island